Wirty  is a settlement in the administrative district of Gmina Zblewo, within Starogard County, Pomeranian Voivodeship, in northern Poland. In the town there is a 33.61 ha arboretum, Arboretum Wirty that was founded in 1875.

For details of the history of the region, see History of Pomerania.

References

Wirty